Catacomb Ridge is a north–south ridge,  high, to the south of Catacomb Hill in the western part of the Denton Hills, Scott Coast. It was named by the New Zealand Geographic Board (1994) in association with Catacomb Hill.

References
 

Ridges of Victoria Land
Scott Coast